The Scarlet Brand is a 1932 American Western film directed by J.P. McGowan and starring Bob Custer, Betty Mack and Robert D. Walker.

Cast
 Bob Custer as Bud Bryson 
 Betty Mack as Ellen Walker 
 Robert D. Walker as Bill Morse 
 Frank Ball as John Walker 
 Duke R. Lee as Sheriff Clem Daniels 
 Nelson McDowell as Slim Grant 
 Blackie Whiteford as Cactus - Henchman 
 Frederick Ryter as Squint - Henchman 
 William L. Nolte as Lefty - Henchman 
 Jack Long as Pete - Henchman

References

Bibliography
 Michael R. Pitts. Poverty Row Studios, 1929–1940: An Illustrated History of 55 Independent Film Companies, with a Filmography for Each. McFarland & Company, 2005.

External links
 

1932 films
1932 Western (genre) films
American Western (genre) films
Films directed by J. P. McGowan
1930s English-language films
1930s American films